Frumpy 2 was the second album by the German progressive rock band Frumpy. It was released in 1971.

Track listing
Tracks on the original release of the album were:

Side one
"Good Winds" (Rumpf) – 10:02
"How the Gypsy Was Born" (Kravetz/Rumpf) – 8:49

Side two
"Take Care of Illusion" (Kravetz/Rumpf) – 7:30
"Duty" (Kravetz/Rumpf) – 12:09

Personnel
 Rainer Baumann – guitar
 Carsten Bohn – drums
 Karl-Heinz Schott – bass
 Jean-Jacques Kravetz – keyboards
 Inga Rumpf – vocals

References

External links
 

1971 albums
Frumpy albums
Philips Records albums